Ruslan Olegovic Kolesnikov (born 24 February 2000) is a Russian amateur boxer who won gold medals at the 2017 and 2018 European Youth Championships, 2018 Youth World Championships, and silver at the 2018 Youth Olympics, all in the light-heavyweight division.

References

External links

Living people
2000 births
Russian male boxers
Light-heavyweight boxers
Boxers at the 2018 Summer Youth Olympics
Medalists at the 2018 Summer Youth Olympics
People from Azov
Sportspeople from Rostov Oblast